Old Independence Cemetery was founded in 1823.  It is located in Independence, Texas, on land donated by Medora Coles McCrocklin, a daughter of Judge J. P. Coles, one of the Old Three Hundred from the Austin Colony. The cemetery was an early community graveyard used by Anglo-American pioneers of Texas.  It is commemorated by a state historical marker.

Numerous prominent figures of the Republic of Texas are buried here, along with founders of Baylor University, which had its first campus in Independence.

Gravestones were cut from native limestone and some are decorated with seashells. There are a number of false crypts in the cemetery.

The nearby "Liberty Cemetery" was used by African-American members of this historic community.

Notable burials in Old Independence Cemetery
 Moses Austin Bryan (1843–1895)
 Sam Houston, Jr. (1843–1894) – First son of Sam Houston
 Tacitus Thomas Clay (1824–1868) – Built Clay Castle
 Ira Randolph Lewis (1800–1867) – Early settler
 Henry Lee Graves (1818–1881) – First President of Baylor University

See also
 National Register of Historic Places in Washington County, Texas

References 

Cemeteries in Texas
Protected areas of Washington County, Texas
1823 establishments in Texas